Astravyets is a city in Grodno Region, Belarus, and the administrative center of Astravyets District.

History
Within the Grand Duchy of Lithuania, Astravyets was part of Vilnius Voivodeship. In 1795, Astravyets was acquired by the Russian Empire in the course of the Third Partition of Poland.

From 1921 until 1939, Astravyets was part of the Second Polish Republic. In September 1939, the town was occupied by the Red Army and, on 14 November 1939, incorporated into the Byelorussian SSR.

From 27 June 1941 until 3 July 1944, Astravyets was occupied by Nazi Germany and administered as a part of the Generalbezirk Litauen of Reichskommissariat Ostland.

On 11 October 2011 an agreement was signed to build Belarus’ first nuclear power plant near the city, using two VVER reactors with active and passive safety systems.

References

External links 

 Photos on Radzima.org
 Photos on Panoramio.com

Astravyets District
Cities in Belarus
Oshmyansky Uyezd
Populated places in Grodno Region
Vilnius Voivodeship
Wilno Voivodeship (1926–1939)